Maria Jansson, known in history as Kisamor (English: The Mother of Kisa), (30 July 1788 – 27 February 1842), was a Swedish natural doctor, one of the most notable and well-known of 19th-century physicians in Sweden. She is also a prominent example of a cunning woman in her country. Her name is Maria Jansson, but she is known in history as Kisamor ("Mother from Kisa") after the place where she worked.

Biography 

Born in Örebro as the daughter of a healer in natural medicine, she had an early wish to follow in her father's profession. She was active as a natural healer occasionally from early years, but eventually, her father forced her to marry a farmer, Anders Olsson, in 1807. The marriage was unhappy and childless, and she divorced her husband in 1819.

By this time, she functioned as a doctor in natural medicine, and made a living visiting and nursing people. She was widely reputed, and called upon from far away. In 1814, she was given a home in Östergötland, Katrinebergs gård, as a gift by some rich female patients in recognition of successful treatment. She made house calls and visited the sick in their cottages. Sometimes, they came to her at an inn called Kisa, and thereby, she became known as Kisamor : "Mother from Kisa". She was described as temperamental and firm, and she is known to have enjoyed alcohol.

Kisamor became famous for her skill, and people came to her from all over the country for consultation and treatment. She was called to Stockholm in 1824, 1825, 1826, 1840 and 1841. On one occasion, she was asked to the royal court to attend one of the female members of the royal family. This has been disputed, however, and the license is not completely confirmed. If it was a reality, she was quite unique, as the profession of a physician was formally barred to her gender in Sweden before 1870.

See also 
 Lovisa Aarberg
 Ingeborg i Mjarhult

References

Sources 
 Österberg, Carin et al., Svenska kvinnor: föregångare, nyskapare (Swedish women:Predecessors, pioneers). Lund: Signum 1990.
 http://art-bin.com/art/akisamo.html
 Karl Henrik Tallmo: Kisamor: Läkarinna där vetenskapen knappt mer hoppas (Kisamor:Doctoress where science dare no longer hope9 (1972)
 Pia Höjeberg: Kisamor (1990)
 https://web.archive.org/web/20091003150847/http://www.edu.linkoping.se/lokalhistoria/oden/2002/maria_jaenson_kisamor.htm

Further reading

External links 
 http://art-bin.com/art/akisamen.html

1788 births
1842 deaths
19th-century Swedish physicians
Swedish women physicians
Swedish physicians
19th-century Swedish people
Cunning folk